KMBA-LP channel 19 was a low-power television station in Ontario, Oregon, owned by Treasure Valley Community College, affiliated with America One. This station is defunct.

External links

Defunct television stations in the United States
Television stations in Oregon
Ontario, Oregon
Television channels and stations established in 1985
Television channels and stations disestablished in 2008
1985 establishments in Oregon
2008 disestablishments in Oregon
MBA-LP